Peyronellaea is a genus of fungi in the family Didymellaceae. It contains a number of plant pathogens.

The genus name of Peyronellaea is in honour of Beniamino Peyronel (1890-1975), who was an Italian botanist (Mycology and Lichenology) from the University of Turin. 
 
The genus was circumscribed by Gabriele Goidànich in Atti Accad. Naz. Lincei, Rendiconti Cl. Sci. Fis. Mat. Nat.
ser.8, vol.1 on page 450 in 1946.

Taxonomy 
Following a phylogenetic analysis of the asexual genus Phoma, section Peyronellaea was raised to the rank of genus. It contains many of the chlamydospore forming species of that genus, from both section Peyronellaea and other sections.

Species include:
 Peyronellaea alectorolophi 
 Peyronellaea americana 
 Peyronellaea arachidicola 
 Peyronellaea aurea 
 Peyronellaea australis 
 Peyronellaea calorpreferens 
 Peyronellaea coffeae-arabicae 
 Peyronellaea curtisii 
 Peyronellaea eucalyptica

References 

Fungal plant pathogens and diseases
Pleosporales
Dothideomycetes genera